Crambus vagistrigellus is a moth in the family Crambidae. It was described by Joseph de Joannis in 1913. It is found in Eritrea.

References

Crambini
Moths described in 1913
Moths of Africa